Union Grove Township is a township in Meeker County, Minnesota, United States. The population was 633 according to the 2010 census. The unincorporated community of Crow River is part of the township.

History

The first white settlers arrived in 1856 and included Lyman Allen, Andrew Hamilton, John Lowell Haywood, Lyman Baker. Many settlers followed in the next two years. During and following the US-Dakota War of 1862, several of the early families left the area and never returned. 

The Union Grove Township was organized on April 30, 1866. The meeting was held in the home of Thomas Ryckman.

Geography
According to the United States Census Bureau, the township has a total area of 36.0 square miles (93.2 km), of which 35.2 square miles (91.0 km) is land and 0.8 square miles (2.1 km) (2.31%) is water.

Union Grove Township is located in Township 121 North of the Arkansas Base Line and Range 32 West of the 5th Principal Meridian.

Demographics
According to the 2010 census, there were 633 people, 228 households and 186 families residing in the township. The population density was 17.8 per square mile (6.9/km). There were 301 housing units at an average density of 8.6/sq mi (3.3/km). The racial makeup of the township was 98.6% White. Hispanic or Latino of any race were 1.4% of the population.

There were 230 households, of which 35.2% had children under the age of 18 living with them, 71.3% were married couples living together, 3.0% had a female householder with no husband present, and 22.6% were non-families. 20.4% of all households were made up of individuals, and 8.7% had someone living alone who was 65 years of age or older. The average household size was 2.72 and the average family size was 3.16.

27.7% of the population were under the age of 18, 8.0% from 18 to 24, 24.8% from 25 to 44, 25.4% from 45 to 64, and 14.1% who were 65 years of age or older. The median age was 40 years. For every 100 females, there were 117.0 males. For every 100 females age 18 and over, there were 112.2 males.

The median household income was $44,732 and the median family income was $52,813. Males had a median income of $30,694 and females $20,893. The per capita income was $21,157. About 2.2% of families and 3.6% of the population were below the poverty line, including 5.6% of those under the age of 18 and none of those 65 and older.

References

Townships in Meeker County, Minnesota
Townships in Minnesota